Seed paper
 is a type of handmade paper that includes any number of different plant seeds. The seeds themselves can still germinate after the papermaking process and they can sprout when the paper is planted in soil.

Papermakers have been producing paper including seeds in the United States since 1941, but international papermakers have practiced seed inclusion in the paper for centuries. Seed paper has traditionally been handmade in smaller batches and is often made-to-order for clients.

Sprouting seed paper has enjoyed a resurgence of popularity in the United States recently. Seed paper can be used for stationery, cards, invitations, and for decorative wraps. In the UK, Little Green Paper Shop has been using seed paper to make bags and packaging for a range of clients.

A wide variety of flower, vegetable, and tree seeds can also be used in seed paper for decorative effect. The seeds and flowers in the paper can create decorative effects and colors. Depending on the type of seed and the process used, different colors, thickness, and patterns can be created.

References

Paper